Wong So Han (born 26 November 1991) is a Hongkonger footballer who plays as a defender for Hong Kong Women League club Happy Valley AA. She is also a futsal player, and represented Hong Kong internationally in both football and futsal.

International career
Wong So Han has been capped for Hong Kong at senior level in both football and futsal. In football, she represented Hong Kong at two AFC Women's Asian Cup qualification editions (2014 and 2018), two AFC Women's Olympic Qualifying Tournament editions (2016 and 2020), two EAFF E-1 Football Championship editions (2017 and 2019) and the 2018 Asian Games.

In futsal, Wong So Han played for Hong Kong at two AFC Women's Futsal Championship editions (2015 and 2018).

See also
List of Hong Kong women's international footballers

References

1991 births
Living people
Hong Kong women's futsal players
Hong Kong women's footballers
Women's association football defenders
Hong Kong women's international footballers
Footballers at the 2014 Asian Games
Footballers at the 2018 Asian Games
Asian Games competitors for Hong Kong